Galendromus is a genus of mites in the Phytoseiidae family.

Species
 Galendromus annectens (De Leon, 1958)
 Galendromus deceptus (Chant & Yoshida-Shaul, 1984)
 Galendromus ferrugineus De Leon, 1962
 Galendromus helveolus (Chant, 1959)
 Galendromus longipilus (Nesbitt, 1951)
 Galendromus occidentalis (Nesbitt, 1951)
 Galendromus pilosus (Chant, 1959)
 Galendromus porresi (McMurtry, 1983)
 Galendromus superstus Zack, 1969
 Galendromus carinulatus (De Leon, 1959)
 Galendromus hondurensis Denmark & Evans, in Denmark, Evans, Aguilar, Vargas & Ochoa 1999
 Galendromus pinnatus (Schuster & Pritchard, 1963)
 Galendromus reticulus Tuttle & Muma, 1973

References

Phytoseiidae